Parajulidae is a family of millipedes in the order Julida, occurring predominantly in North America but also in Central America and East Asia. Parajulids are found from Alaska to as far south as Guatemala.  Male Parajulids have a greatly enlarged first pair of legs, and externally exposed gonopods, in contrast to the largely Eurasian family Julidae which have a small, hook-shaped first pair of legs, and gonopods concealed internally.

Genera

Aliulus  
Aniulus
Apacheiulus  
Arvechamboides  
Arvechambus  
Bollmaniulus  
Codiulus  
Ethoiulus  
Ethojulus  
Georgiulus  
Gosiulus  
Gyniulus  
Hakiulus  
Karteroiulus  
Litiulus  
Mexicoiulus  
Mulaikiulus  
Nesoressa  
Okliulus  
Oriulus  
Parajulus  
Pheniulus  
Pseudojulus  
Ptyoiulus  
Saiulus  
Simiulus  
Sophiulus  
Spathiulus  
Teniulus  
Thriniulus  
Tuniulus  
Uroblaniulus  
Ziniulus

References

External links
Photographs of North American Parajulids

Julida
Millipede families
Taxa named by Charles Harvey Bollman